Antipterna homoleuca is a species of moth in the family Oecophoridae, first described by Edward Meyrick in 1885 as Ocystola homoleuca. The lectotype for Ocystola homoleuca was collected at Wirrabara, South Australia, while that for Ocystola argophanes was collected in Brisbane, Queensland.

Meyrick's description

Further reading

References

Oecophorinae
Taxa described in 1885
Taxa named by Edward Meyrick